Josef Fath (27 December 1911 – 13 August 1985) was a German footballer.

The forward won 13 caps for the German national team in which he scored 7 goals.

References

External links
 
 
 

1911 births
1985 deaths
Association football midfielders
German footballers
Germany international footballers